Borgoratto Alessandrino is a comune (municipality) in the Province of Alessandria in the Italian region of Piedmont, located about  southeast of Turin and about  southwest of Alessandria, on the Bormida river.

It borders the following municipalities: Carentino, Castellazzo Bormida, Frascaro, and Oviglio.

References

Cities and towns in Piedmont